

List of Ambassadors

Orna Sagiv 2021-
Meir Shlomo (Non-Resident, Bangkok) 2017 - 
Simon Roded
Yael Rubinstein 2005-2009  
Shimon Avimor 1972 - 1975
Emmanuel Galbar 1970 - 1972
Rafael Benshalom 1967 - 1969
Mordecai Kidron (Non-Resident, Bangkok) 1958 - 1963

References

Cambodia
Israel